Group B of the 2013 Africa Cup of Nations ran from 20 January until 28 January. It consisted of Ghana, Mali, Niger and Congo DR. The matches were held in the South African cities of Port Elizabeth and Durban.

Standings

All times South African Standard Time (UTC+2)

Ghana vs. Congo DR

Mali vs. Niger

Ghana vs. Mali

Niger vs. Congo DR

Niger vs. Ghana

Congo DR vs. Mali

References

External links

2013 Africa Cup of Nations